Nibbles (also known as Tuffy) is a fictional character from the Tom and Jerry cartoon series. He is the little, blue/gray, nappy-wearing orphan mouse whose cartoon debut came in the 1946 short The Milky Waif. Tuffy was later featured in the 1949 Academy Award-winning short The Little Orphan, as well as Two Little Indians and The Two Mouseketeers (both 1952).

Origin and development

The character's first actual appearance came in the 1942 comic book Our Gang Comics #1, where despite his nappy, he was presented as a peer of Jerry rather than a younger individual. Nibbles was created by Gaylord Du Bois. In the comics, the gray mouse's name was given as Tuffy Mouse from the start. In the animated series. Nibbles is depicted as a hungry and curious orphaned mouse where he is mentioned to live at the fictional Bide-a-wee Mouse Home.

Featured cartoons

Tom and Jerry 
 The Milky Waif (1946)
 The Little Orphan (1949)
 Safety Second (1950)
 The Two Mouseketeers (1952)
 Two Little Indians (appears with an identical twin) (1953)
 Life with Tom (1953)
 Little School Mouse (1954)
 Mice Follies (1954)
 Touché, Pussy Cat! (1954)
 Tom and Chérie (1955)
 Feedin' the Kiddie (1957)
 Royal Cat Nap (1958)
 Robin Hoodwinked (1958)

The Tom and Jerry Comedy Show
 Pied Piper Puss
 No Museum Peace

Tom and Jerry Kids
Musketeer Jr.

Tom & Jerry Tales
 Cat Nebula
 Cat Show Catastrophe
 Cat of Prey (cameo appearance)
 Sasquashed
 DJ Jerry (cameo appearance)

The Tom and Jerry Show (2014)
 Haunted Mouse
 What a Pain
 Tuffy Love
 Just Plane Nuts
 Pets Not Welcome
 Cruisin' for a Bruisin'''
 Hunger Strikes Say Cheese Picture Imperfect Slinging in the Rain The Paper Airplane Chase Say Uncle Here Comes the Bride Tuffy's Big Adventure Hockey JockeyTom and Jerry in New York

Voice actors
English
 Francoise Brun-Cottan (1952–1958)
 Lucille Bliss: Robin Hoodwinked (1958)
 Lou Scheimer: The Tom and Jerry Comedy Show Frank Welker: The Tom and Jerry Comedy Show (wraparound segment in episode 8)
 Charlie Adler: Tom & Jerry Kids Tara Strong: Tom and Jerry: The Magic Ring Alan Marriott: Tom and Jerry in Fists of Furry, Tom and Jerry in War of the Whiskers Reece Thompson: Tom and Jerry Tales (1 episode only)
 Kath Soucie: (2010–present), Tom and Jerry Meet Sherlock Holmes, Tom and Jerry and the Wizard of Oz, The Tom and Jerry Show, Tom and Jerry: Willy Wonka and the Chocolate Factory, Tom and Jerry in New York Chantal Strand: Tom and Jerry: A Nutcracker Tale, Tom and Jerry Tales'' (3 episodes)

References

Tom and Jerry characters
MGM cartoon characters
Fictional anthropomorphic characters
Fictional mice and rats
Film characters introduced in 1946
Child characters in television
Male characters in animation
Male characters in television